The 2019 CPL–U Sports Draft was the second annual CPL–U Sports Draft. It was held on November 11, 2019 in Montreal, Quebec. Seven Canadian Premier League (CPL) teams selected 14 eligible U Sports athletes in total.

Format

Each CPL team will make two selection in the U Sports Draft. Players can be selected if they have years of U Sports eligibility remaining and have declared for the draft.

For the non-finalist teams, the CPL combined standings were used to determine the order for the first round, with last-placed HFX Wanderers FC selecting first. Finals runner-up Cavalry FC selected sixth, while champions Forge FC selected seventh. A "snake draft" was used, with the order reversing in the second round.

Player selection

Round 1

Round 2

Source:

Selection statistics

Draftees by nationality

Canadian draftees by province

Draftees by university

References

2020 Canadian Premier League
2019
2019 in Canadian soccer
2019 in Quebec
2010s in Montreal
Soccer in Montreal
Events in Montreal
November 2019 sports events in Canada